The 2005 Under-21 Rugby World Championship took place in Argentina between 9 June and 25 June 2005. The 2005 championship was the fourth contested. This championship saw South Africa win the final over Australia 24–20.

Venues

Participants 
The following 12 teams participated in the 2005 Under-21 Rugby World Championship.

Pool stages 
The 12 teams were split into four groups of three teams. After all pool matches teams are ranked by total match points. Four group winners qualify for the semi-finals and bottom eight enter play-offs for positions 5–8 and 9–12.

Pool A–D

9 June,	New Zealand	60–15	Wales	        Liceo RC, Mendoza
9 June,	Scotland	22–28	Australia	Chacras RC, Mendoza
9 June,	Argentina	65–7	Canada	        Liceo RC, Mendoza
13 June,	New Zealand	92–7	Canada	        Mendoza RC, Mendoza
13 June,	Scotland	8–24	Wales	        Maristas RC, Mendoza
13 June,	Argentina	20–25	Australia	Mendoza RC, Mendoza
17 June,	New Zealand	43–46	Australia	Chacras RC, Mendoza
17 June,	Scotland	52–20	Canada	        Liceo RC, Mendoza
17 June,	Argentina	36–31	Wales	        Chacras RC, Mendoza

Pool B–C

9 June,  England  52–22  Samoa  Maristas RC, Mendoza
9 June,  Italy  3–83  South Africa  Maristas RC, Mendoza
9 June,	Ireland	        23–31	France	        Chacras RC, Mendoza
13 June,	England	        16–34	South Africa	Liceo RC, Mendoza
13 June,	Ireland	        29–21	Samoa	        Maristas RC, Mendoza
13 June,	Italy	        40–43	France	        Liceo RC, Mendoza
17 June,	England	        27–37	France	        Mendoza RC, Mendoza
17 June,	Italy	        20–23	Samoa	        Mendoza RC, Mendoza
17 June,	Ireland	        25–42	South Africa	Liceo RC, Mendoza

Semi-finals
21 June, Argentina	20–6	England	Mendoza RC, Mendoza
21 June, Ireland	77–3	Canada	Chacras RC, Mendoza
21 June, South Africa	16–12	New Zealand	Liceo RC, Mendoza
21 June, Wales	25–43	Scotland	Mendoza RC, Mendoza
21 June, Samoa	38–25	Italy	Chacras RC, Mendoza
21 June, France	16–28	Australia	Liceo RC, Mendoza

Play-Offs
11th Place Play-Off
25 June, 	Italy 30–33	Canada	Chacras RC, Mendoza
9th Place Play-Off
25 June, 	Ireland	34–17	Samoa	Maristas RC, Mendoza
7th Place Play-Off
25 June, 	Wales	32–57	England	Liceo RC, Mendoza
5th Place Play-Off
25 June, 	Argentina	39–7	Scotland	Mendoza RC, Mendoza
3rd Place Play-Off
25 June, 	France	21–47	New Zealand	Malvinas Argentinas, Mendoza

Championship final
25 June, South Africa	24–20	Australia	Malvinas Argentinas, Mendoza

External links
IRB21.com
IRB.com

2005
2005 rugby union tournaments for national teams
2005 in Argentine rugby union
International rugby union competitions hosted by Argentina
rugby union
rugby union